KYVT (88.5 FM) is a radio station in Yakima, Washington. The station is owned by the Yakima School District. On August 14, 2012, the station began carrying the NPR News Service of Northwest Public Radio, via a partnership between the Yakima School District, the Yakima Valley Technical Skills Center, and Washington State University, which also includes educational opportunities for students interested in broadcasting careers. Previously, station programming originated at the Yakima Valley Technical Skills Center, and was an alternative rock format. The original programming format is now carried on HD Radio via KNWY

History
The station went on the air as KYSC on 1980-09-08.  On 2000-02-04, the station changed its call sign to the current KYVT.

References

External links

High school radio stations in the United States
YVT